Bhaduri is an Indian Hindu family name found among Bengali Brahmins. Notable people with the surname include:

Abhijit Bhaduri, Indian author, columnist and management consultant 
Chapal Bhaduri, Indian actor
Nrisingha Prasad Bhaduri, Indian historian, writer and Indologist
Rita Bhaduri, Indian actress
Satinath Bhaduri, Indian Bengali novelist and politician
Sisir Kumar Bhaduri, Indian actor, director, pioneer of modern Indian theatre
Sibdas Bhaduri, Indian professional footballer
Tripti Bhaduri, Indian actress
Jaya Bhaduri, Indian film actress and politician
Amar Nath Bhaduri, Indian chemical biologist

Indian surnames
 Bengali Hindu surnames